Georgia Lorraine Ellenwood (born 5 August 1995) is a Canadian athlete competing in combined events.

Career
She represented Canada at the 2016 World Indoor Championships, finishing tenth, and also represented Canada at the 2020 Olympics in Tokyo. Georgia Ellenwood is an 8-time NCAA Division I All-American, 2018 Big Ten Conference Field athlete of the year after setting a new personal best and a Wisconsin Badgers school record. CKWX NEWS 1130 in British Columbia, Canada profiled Ellenwood's journey. Ellenwood is a Langley Secondary School 2013 graduate.
Ellenwood competed at the 2020 Summer Olympics.

Competition record

Personal bests
Outdoor
200 metres – 24.22 (+1.4 m/s, Götzis 2021)
800 metres – 2:11.45 (Ratingen 2021)
100 metres hurdles – 13.40 (Ratingen 2021)
High jump – 1.83 (Tokyo 2021)
Long jump – 6.26 (Gotzis 2021)
Shot put – 13.00 (Toronto 2021)
Javelin Throw – 48.57 (Ratingen 2021)
Heptathlon – 6314 (Ratingen 2021)
Indoor
800 metres – 2:14.28 (College Station 2018)
60 metres hurdles – 8.35 (Toronto 2022)
High jump – 1.82 (Geneva, OH 2016)
Long jump – 6.08 (Birmingham 2016)
Shot put – 13.41 (Toronto 2021)
Pentathlon – 4390 (Birmingham 2016)

References

External links
 
 
 
 
 
 Georgia Ellenwood at Wisconsin Badgers
 

1995 births
Living people
Canadian heptathletes
People from Langley, British Columbia (city)
Wisconsin Badgers women's track and field athletes
Competitors at the 2015 Summer Universiade
Athletes (track and field) at the 2020 Summer Olympics
Olympic track and field athletes of Canada
20th-century Canadian women